Mehmet Altin (born 15 July 1959) is a Turkish weightlifter. He competed in the men's bantamweight event at the 1984 Summer Olympics.

References

External links

1959 births
Living people
Turkish male weightlifters
Olympic weightlifters of Turkey
Weightlifters at the 1984 Summer Olympics
Place of birth missing (living people)